Karno Barkah (December 26, 1922 – October 24, 2009) is an Indonesian aviation pioneer and recipient of the prestigious French Légion d'honneur (28 February 1984).

Information
He is most well known for envisioning Indonesia's award-winning Soekarno-Hatta International Airport in Jakarta.   Barkah was responsible for the airport's construction, and later became its first President Director.

Barkah served as Indonesia's chief representative to the International Civil Aviation Organization (ICAO) in Montreal, where he was elected as Chairman of ICAO's Conditions of Service Working Group.

References

1922 births
2009 deaths
Indonesian aviators